NER  may refer to:
 New European Recordings, a record label
 ISO 3166-1 three letter code for Niger
 Named entity recognition, a text processing task that identifies certain words as belonging to one class or another
 Northeast Regional, an Amtrak route that operates along the Northeast Corridor, in the US.
 North Eastern Railway (India)
 North Eastern Railway (United Kingdom)
 Northern and Eastern Railway (N&ER), an early British rail company
 North-East India, known as North Eastern Region
 Nucleotide excision repair, a DNA repair mechanism
 Network Effectiveness Ratio, KPI in telecommunications
 New England Revolution, American soccer team
 Nemzeti Együttműködés Rendszere (NER), the network of political and cultural institutions and private corporations closely aligned with Prime Minister Viktor Orbán or with the national-conservative Fidesz party in Hungary

See also
 Ner, a river in Poland
 Ner, Łódź Voivodeship, a village in central Poland
 Ner (Bible), a person mentioned in the Bible
 Entity linking, part of Named Entity Recognition